

Canadian football news in 1914
The remnants of the Hamilton Alerts operated separately from any Union for several seasons before fading from the scene. The CRU appointed head linesmen and the CIRFU adopted a three-yard interference rule while the IRFU adopted a residence rule.

Regular season

Final regular season standings
Note: GP = Games played, W = Wins, L = Losses, T = Ties, PF = Points for, PA = Points against, Pts = Points
*Bold text means that they have clinched the playoffs

League champions

Grey Cup playoffs
Note: All dates in 1914

Alberta Rugby Football Union playoffs

University of Alberta Varsity wins the total-point series 20-15.

SRFU Playoff

Regina advances to the West Final.

West Final - SRFU–MRFU Inter-League Playoff

IRFU Playoff

Toronto advances to the East Final.

CIRFU playoff

Varsity advances to the Grey Cup.

East final

Toronto Argonauts advance to the Grey Cup.

Playoff bracket

Grey Cup Championship

References

 
Canadian Football League seasons